The 2018–19 Dallas Mavericks season was the 39th season of the franchise in the National Basketball Association (NBA). With an overtime loss to the New Orleans Pelicans on March 18, the Mavericks would once again have a losing season and not make the playoffs for the third consecutive year.

It was Dirk Nowitzki's 21st and final season with the Mavericks, making his season debut on December 13, 2018 against the Phoenix Suns. Not only would he break a record previously set by Kobe Bryant for the most seasons spent playing for a single NBA team, but he also became the fifth player in the NBA history to play in the league for 21 seasons. Believed by many as the greatest Maverick of all time, Nowitzki led the Mavs to 15 playoff appearances (2001-2012; 2014-2016), to a Finals appearance in 2006, and to their first championship title in 2011, defeating the Big 3-led Miami Heat. A 14-time NBA All-Star, Nowitzki is the first European player to start in an All-Star Game, and the first to win the MVP Award. He is also the highest scoring foreign-born player in NBA history and on March 18, 2019, became the 6th highest scoring player of all time, surpassing Wilt Chamberlain's 31,419 points. Nowitzki's retirement leaves former Maverick and fellow 1998 draftee Vince Carter (who played for the Atlanta Hawks) as the last remaining active player to have played in the 1990s. Additionally, Carter became the first player to play in 4 different decades after retiring the following season, a record that Nowitzki could have possibly achieved prior to announcing his retirement on April 9, 2019.

On January 31, 2019, the Mavericks acquired NBA All-Star Kristaps Porziņģis in exchange for Wesley Matthews and former no. 9 overall pick Dennis Smith Jr.

Draft

Entering the night of the draft, the Mavericks originally held only the fifth, thirty-third, and fifty-fourth picks of the 2018 NBA Draft. The last of their second round picks was acquired from a three-way trade the previous season from the Denver Nuggets that also involved the New York Knicks. The Mavericks originally fell down a spot from fourth to fifth during the NBA Draft Lottery due to them originally missing out on the Top 3 selections, despite having the tiebreaker over the Atlanta Hawks for better odds there. This also resulted in them having the better second round pick over the Hawks by comparison. Ironically, by the night of the draft, Dallas traded their original first round pick in the draft (which became Oklahoma Sooners point guard Trae Young) and a protected 2019 first round pick to Atlanta in exchange for the Hawks' own first round pick, which became the Slovenian superstar guard/forward Luka Dončić. Dončić is a combo guard/small forward that grew to be a very major contributor for Real Madrid Baloncesto in the EuroLeague and Spain's national Liga ACB, winning championships and MVP awards throughout his professional tenure there, including being named the youngest ever EuroLeague Final Four MVP that year.

During the beginning of the second round, the Mavericks selected point guard Jalen Brunson from Villanova University. Brunson was a key contributor for two out of three years of NCAA Championships during his time at Villanova, with his second championship year (final college year overall) also naming him both the consensus National College Player of the Year and All-American First Team member. Finally, with their last (54th) pick, they traded that selection (which became Southern Methodist University point guard Shake Milton) to the Philadelphia 76ers in exchange for their last two second round picks this year. With pick #57, the Mavericks received power forward Ray Spalding from Louisville University, while the very last selection of the 2018 NBA Draft became combo forward Kostas Antetokounmpo, younger brother of superstar Giannis Antetokounmpo, from Dayton University. Antetokounmpo later signed a two-way contract to stay with the team on July 13, 2018.

Roster

<noinclude>

Standings

Division

Conference

Game log

Preseason
The preseason scheduled was announced on August 23, 2018.

|-bgcolor=ccffcc
| 1
| September 29
| Beijing
| 
| Dončić, Smith Jr. (16)
| Jordan, Kleber (8)
| Dennis Smith Jr. (6)
| American Airlines Center18,325
| 1–0
|-bgcolor=ffcccc
| 2
| October 5
| @ Philadelphia
| 
| Dennis Smith Jr. (23)
| Maxi Kleber (7)
| J. J. Barea (9)
| Mercedes-Benz Arena15,992
| 1–1
|-bgcolor=ccffcc
| 3
| October 8
| @ Philadelphia
| 
| Luka Dončić (15)
| Maxi Kleber (7)
| Dončić, Smith Jr. (16)
| Shenzhen Universiade Sports Centre17,396
| 2–1
|-bgcolor=ffcccc
| 4
| October 12
| Charlotte
| 
| Dončić, Jordan (18)
| DeAndre Jordan (12)
| Wesley Matthews (5)
| American Airlines Center18,745
| 2–2

Regular season
The schedule was announced on August 10, 2018.

|-bgcolor=ffcccc
| 1
| October 17
| @ Phoenix
| 
| Dwight Powell (16)
| DeAndre Jordan (12)
| J. J. Barea (10)
| Talking Stick Resort Arena18,055
| 0–1
|-bgcolor=ccffcc
| 2
| October 20
| Minnesota
| 
| Luka Dončić (26)
| DeAndre Jordan (10)
| J. J. Barea (11)
| American Airlines Center20,205
| 1–1
|-bgcolor=ccffcc
| 3
| October 22
| Chicago
| 
| Wesley Matthews (20)
| DeAndre Jordan (16)
| Luka Dončić (6)
| American Airlines Center19,291
| 2–1
|-bgcolor=ffcccc
| 4
| October 24
| @ Atlanta
| 
| Wesley Matthews (23)
| DeAndre Jordan (13)
| J. J. Barea (9)
| State Farm Arena16,705
| 2–2
|-bgcolor=ffcccc
| 5
| October 26
| @ Toronto
| 
| Luka Dončić (22)
| DeAndre Jordan (15)
| DeAndre Jordan (5)
| Scotiabank Arena19,800
| 2–3
|-bgcolor=ffcccc
| 6
| October 28
| Utah
| 
| Dennis Smith Jr. (27)
| DeAndre Jordan (19)
| DeAndre Jordan (9)
| American Airlines Center19,571
| 2–4
|-bgcolor=ffcccc
| 7
| October 29
| @ San Antonio
| 
| Luka Dončić (31)
| DeAndre Jordan (18)
| Dončić, Smith Jr. (4)
| AT&T Center18,354
| 2–5
|-bgcolor=ffcccc
| 8
| October 31
| @ LA Lakers
| 
| Wesley Matthews (21)
| DeAndre Jordan (12)
| J. J. Barea (10)
| Staples Center18,997
| 2–6

|-bgcolor=ffcccc
| 9
| November 2
| New York
| 
| Dennis Smith Jr. (23)
| DeAndre Jordan (10)
| Barea, Dončić (6)
| American Airlines Center20,008
| 2–7
|-bgcolor=ccffcc
| 10
| November 6
| Washington
| 
| Luka Dončić (23)
| Harrison Barnes (13)
| J. J. Barea (8)
| American Airlines Center19,234
| 3–7
|-bgcolor=ffcccc
| 11
| November 7
| @ Utah
| 
| Luka Dončić (24)
| DeAndre Jordan (12)
| Wesley Matthews (4)
| Vivint Smart Home Arena18,306
| 3–8
|-bgcolor=ccffcc
| 12
| November 10
| Oklahoma City
| 
| Luka Dončić (22)
| DeAndre Jordan (9)
| Luka Dončić (8)
| American Airlines Center19,818
| 4–8
|-bgcolor=ccffcc
| 13
| November 12
| @ Chicago
| 
| Harrison Barnes (23)
| DeAndre Jordan (16)
| J. J. Barea (5)
| United Center19,012
| 5–8
|-bgcolor=ccffcc
| 14
| November 14
| Utah
| 
| Harrison Barnes (19)
| DeAndre Jordan (10)
| J. J. Barea (5)
| American Airlines Center19,371
| 6–8
|-bgcolor=ccffcc
| 15
| November 17
| Golden State
| 
| Luka Dončić (24)
| DeAndre Jordan (10)
| Dennis Smith Jr. (6)
| American Airlines Center20,260
| 7–8
|-bgcolor=ffcccc
| 16
| November 19
| @ Memphis
| 
| Dennis Smith Jr. (19)
| DeAndre Jordan (20)
| Dennis Smith Jr. (5)
| FedExForum15,997
| 7–9
|-bgcolor=ccffcc
| 17
| November 21
| Brooklyn
| 
| Harrison Barnes (28)
| DeAndre Jordan (14)
| J. J. Barea (7)
| American Airlines Center19,926
| 8–9
|-bgcolor=ccffcc
| 18
| November 24
| Boston
| 
| Barea, Barnes (20)
| DeAndre Jordan (13)
| Barea, Dončić (8)
| American Airlines Center20,226
| 9–9
|-bgcolor=ccffcc
| 19
| November 28
| @ Houston
| 
| Dončić, Harris (20)
| DeAndre Jordan (7)
| J. J. Barea (12)
| Toyota Center18,055
| 10–9
|-bgcolor=ffcccc
| 20
| November 30
| @ LA Lakers
| 
| Harrison Barnes (29)
| DeAndre Jordan (12)
| Luka Dončić (5)
| Staples Center18,997
| 10–10

|-bgcolor=ccffcc
| 21
| December 2
| LA Clippers
| 
| Harrison Barnes (30)
| DeAndre Jordan (23)
| Dennis Smith Jr. (5)
| American Airlines Center19,551
| 11–10
|-bgcolor=ccffcc
| 22
| December 4
| Portland
| 
| Luka Dončić (21)
| DeAndre Jordan (17)
| Dennis Smith Jr. (9)
| American Airlines Center19,341
| 12–10
|-bgcolor=ffcccc
| 23
| December 5
| @ New Orleans
| 
| Harrison Barnes (16)
| Dwight Powell (10)
| Jalen Brunson (7)
| Smoothie King Center14,810
| 12–11
|-bgcolor=ccffcc
| 24
| December 8
| Houston
| 
| Dončić, Matthews (21)
| DeAndre Jordan (20)
| J. J. Barea (4)
| American Airlines Center20,254
| 13–11
|-bgcolor=ccffcc
| 25
| December 10
| Orlando
| 
| Harrison Barnes (19)
| Luka Dončić (11)
| Luka Dončić (9)
| American Airlines Center19,334
| 14–11
|-bgcolor=ccffcc
| 26
| December 12
| Atlanta
| 
| Harrison Barnes (25)
| DeAndre Jordan (11)
| Luka Dončić (6)
| American Airlines Center19,643
| 15–11
|-bgcolor=ffcccc
| 27
| December 13
| @ Phoenix
| 
| Harrison Barnes (15)
| DeAndre Jordan (15)
| Luka Dončić (6)
| Talking Stick Resort Arena13,265
| 15–12
|-bgcolor=ffcccc
| 28
| December 16
| Sacramento
| 
| Luka Dončić (28)
| DeAndre Jordan (23)
| Luka Dončić (9)
| American Airlines Center19,935
| 15–13
|-bgcolor=ffcccc
| 29
| December 18
| @ Denver
| 
| Harrison Barnes (30)
| DeAndre Jordan (12)
| Luka Dončić (12)
| Pepsi Center15,764
| 15–14
|-bgcolor=ffcccc
| 30
| December 20
| @  LA Clippers
| 
| Luka Dončić (32)
| DeAndre Jordan (22)
| J. J. Barea (8)
| Staples Center17,528
| 15–15
|-bgcolor=ffcccc
| 31
| December 22
| @ Golden State
| 
| Wesley Matthews (25)
| DeAndre Jordan (23)
| J. J. Barea (6)
| Oracle Arena19,596
| 15–16
|-bgcolor=ffcccc
| 32
| December 23
| @ Portland
| 
| Harrison Barnes (27)
| Luka Dončić (11)
| J. J. Barea (8)
| Moda Center19,707
| 15–17
|-bgcolor=ccffcc
| 33
| December 26
| New Orleans
| 
| Luka Dončić (21)
| DeAndre Jordan (12)
| Luka Dončić  (10)
| American Airlines Center20,340
| 16–17
|-bgcolor=ffcccc
| 34
| December 28
| @ New Orleans
| 
| Luka Dončić (34)
| DeAndre Jordan (15)
| three players (4)
| Smoothie King Center18,364
| 16–18
|-bgcolor=ccffcc
| 35
| December 30
| Oklahoma City
| 
| Luka Dončić (25)
| DeAndre Jordan (17)
| J. J. Barea (10)
| American Airlines Center20,380
| 17–18
|-bgcolor=ffcccc
| 36
| December 31
| @ Oklahoma City
| 
| Harrison Barnes (25)
| DeAndre Jordan (10)
| Dončić, Smith Jr. (3)
| Chesapeake Energy Arena18,203
| 17–19

|-bgcolor=ccffcc
| 37
| January 2
| @ Charlotte
| 
| Dončić, Smith Jr. (18)
| DeAndre Jordan (13)
| Dennis Smith Jr. (7)
| Spectrum Center16,955
| 18–19
|-bgcolor=ffcccc
| 38
| January 4
| @ Boston
| 
| Harrison Barnes (20)
| DeAndre Jordan (15)
| Luka Dončić (4)
| TD Garden18,624
| 18–20
|-bgcolor=ffcccc
| 39
| January 5
| @ Philadelphia
| 
| Wesley Matthews (18)
| Jalen Brunson (11)
| Jalen Brunson (8)
| Wells Fargo Center20,656
| 18–21
|-bgcolor=ffcccc
| 40
| January 7
| LA Lakers
| 
| Luka Dončić (27)
| DeAndre Jordan (19)
| J. J. Barea (3)
| American Airlines Center20,354
| 18–22
|-bgcolor=ccffcc
| 41
| January 9
| Phoenix
| 
| Luka Dončić (30)
| Maxi Kleber (9)
| Dončić, Matthews (5)
| American Airlines Center19,596
| 19–22
|-bgcolor=ccffcc
| 42
| January 11
| @ Minnesota
| 
| Luka Dončić (29)
| DeAndre Jordan (15)
| Luka Dončić (12)
| Target Center18,978
| 20–22
|-bgcolor=ffcccc
| 43
| January 13
| Golden State
| 
| Luka Dončić (26)
| DeAndre Jordan (14)
| Dončić, Matthews (5)
| American Airlines Center20,340
| 20–23
|-bgcolor=ffcccc
| 44
| January 16
| San Antonio
| 
| Luka Dončić (25)
| DeAndre Jordan (9)
| Luka Dončić (8)
| American Airlines Center20,214
| 20–24
|-bgcolor=ffcccc
| 45
| January 19
| @ Indiana
| 
| Harrison Barnes (20)
| DeAndre Jordan (16)
| Luka Dončić (6)
| Bankers Life Fieldhouse17,508
| 20–25
|-bgcolor=ffcccc
| 46
| January 21
| @ Milwaukee
| 
| Luka Dončić (18)
| DeAndre Jordan (15)
| Luka Dončić (10)
| Fiserv Forum17,963
| 20–26
|-bgcolor=ccffcc
| 47
| January 22
| LA Clippers
| 
| Harrison Barnes (20)
| DeAndre Jordan (16)
| Luka Dončić (6)
| American Airlines Center19,466
| 21–26
|-bgcolor=ccffcc
| 48
| January 25
| Detroit
| 
| Luka Dončić (32)
| DeAndre Jordan (11)
| Luka Dončić (8)
| American Airlines Center20,327
| 22–26
|-bgcolor=ffcccc
| 49
| January 27
| Toronto
| 
| Luka Dončić (35)
| Luka Dončić (12)
| Luka Dončić (10)
| American Airlines Center20,308
| 22–27
|-bgcolor=ccffcc
| 50
| January 30
| @ New York
| 
| Harrison Barnes (20)
| Dennis Smith Jr. (10)
| Dennis Smith Jr. (15)
| Madison Square Garden18,842
| 23–27
|-bgcolor=ffcccc
| 51
| January 31
| @ Detroit
| 
| Harrison Barnes (27)
| Maxi Kleber (8)
| Jalen Brunson (6)
| Little Caesars Arena14,075
| 23–28

|-bgcolor=ccffcc
| 52
| February 2
| @ Cleveland
| 
| Luka Dončić (35)
| Luka Dončić (11)
| Luka Dončić (6)
| Quicken Loans Arena19,432
| 24–28
|-bgcolor=ccffcc
| 53
| February 6
| Charlotte
| 
| Luka Dončić (19)
| Dwight Powell (12)
| Luka Dončić (11)
| American Airlines Center19,606
| 25–28
|-bgcolor=ffcccc
| 54
| February 8
| Milwaukee
| 
| Luka Dončić (20)
| Dwight Powell (8)
| Trey Burke (5)
| American Airlines Center20,420
| 25–29
|-bgcolor=ccffcc
| 55
| February 10
| Portland
| 
| Luka Dončić (28)
| Luka Dončić (9)
| Jalen Brunson (7)
| American Airlines Center20,340
| 26–29
|-bgcolor=ffcccc
| 56
| February 11
| @ Houston
| 
| Luka Dončić (21)
| Luka Dončić (10)
| Luka Dončić (8)
| Toyota Center18,055
| 26–30
|-bgcolor=ffcccc
| 57
| February 13
| Miami
| 
| Tim Hardaway Jr. (20)
| Luka Dončić (12)
| Luka Dončić (9)
| American Airlines Center20,364
| 26–31
|-bgcolor=ffcccc
| 58
| February 22
| Denver
| 
| Jalen Brunson (22)
| Dorian Finney-Smith (9)
| Harris, Brunson (5)
| American Airlines Center20,382
| 26–32
|-bgcolor=ffcccc
| 59
| February 23
| @ Utah
| 
| Tim Hardaway Jr. (21)
| Trey Burke (7)
| Tim Hardaway Jr. (4)
| Vivint Smart Home Arena18,306
| 26–33
|-bgcolor=ffcccc
| 60
| February 25
| @ LA Clippers
| 
| Luka Dončić (28)
| Dončić, Finney-Smith (10)
| Luka Dončić (10)
| Staples Center19,068
| 26–34
|-bgcolor=ccffcc
| 61
| February 27
| Indiana
| 
| Luka Dončić (26)
| Luka Dončić (10)
| Luka Dončić (7)
| American Airlines Center19,978
| 27–34

|-bgcolor=ffcccc
| 62
| March 2
| Memphis
| 
| Luka Dončić (22)
| Dwight Powell (8)
| Dwight Powell (4)
| American Airlines Center20,233
| 27–35
|-bgcolor=ffcccc
| 63
| March 4
| @ Brooklyn
| 
| Dwight Powell (20)
| Dončić, Powell (6)
| Luka Dončić (6)
| Barclays Center17,064
| 27–36
|-bgcolor=ffcccc
| 64
| March 6
| @ Washington
| 
| Luka Dončić (31)
| Luka Dončić (11)
| Jalen Brunson (8)
| Capital One Arena16,867
| 27–37
|-bgcolor=ffcccc
| 65
| March 8
| @ Orlando
| 
| Luka Dončić (24)
| Luka Dončić (8)
| Jalen Brunson (9)
| Amway Center19,196
| 27–38
|-bgcolor=ffcccc
| 66
| March 10
| Houston
| 
| Luka Dončić (19)
| Luka Dončić (15)
| Luka Dončić (9)
| American Airlines Center20,423
| 27–39
|-bgcolor=ffcccc
| 67
| March 12
| San Antonio
| 
| Jalen Brunson (34)
| Finney-Smith, Powell (6)
| Luka Dončić (7)
| American Airlines Center20,366
| 27–40
|-bgcolor=ffcccc
| 68
| March 14
| @ Denver
| 
| Luka Dončić (24)
| Dončić, Kleber (11)
| Luka Dončić (9)
| Pepsi Center19,520
| 27–41
|-bgcolor=ccffcc
| 69
| March 16
| Cleveland
| 
| Tim Hardaway Jr. (22)
| Maxi Kleber (12)
| Jalen Brunson (7)
| American Airlines Center20,347
| 28–41
|-bgcolor=ffcccc
| 70
| March 18
| New Orleans
| 
| Luka Dončić (29)
| Luka Dončić (13)
| Luka Dončić (10)
| American Airlines Center20,276
| 28–42
|-bgcolor=ffcccc
| 71
| March 20
| @ Portland
| 
| Luka Dončić (24)
| Dwight Powell (9)
| Luka Dončić (6)
| Moda Center19,803
| 28–43
|-bgcolor=ffcccc
| 72
| March 21
| @ Sacramento
| 
| Justin Jackson (19)
| Luka Dončić (10)
| Dwight Powell (5)
| Golden 1 Center17,583
| 28–44
|-bgcolor=ccffcc
| 73
| March 23
| @ Golden State
| 
| Luka Dončić (23)
| Luka Dončić (11)
| Luka Dončić (10)
| Oracle Arena19,596
| 29–44
|-bgcolor=ffcccc
| 74
| March 26
| Sacramento
| 
| Luka Dončić (28)
| Dwight Powell (13)
| Luka Dončić (12)
| American Airlines Center20,168
| 29–45
|-bgcolor=ffcccc
| 75
| March 28
| @ Miami
| 
| Luka Dončić (19)
| Maxi Kleber (10)
| Luka Dončić (7)
| American Airlines Arena19,851
| 29–46
|-bgcolor=ccffcc
| 76
| March 31
| @ Oklahoma City
| 
| Trey Burke (25)
| Dirk Nowitzki (13)
| Trey Burke (8)
| Chesapeake Energy Arena18,203
| 30–46

|-bgcolor=ccffcc
| 77
| April 1
| Philadelphia
| 
| Justin Jackson (24)
| Salah Mejri (14)
| Jalen Brunson (7)
| American Airlines Center19,645
| 31–46
|-bgcolor=ffcccc
| 78
| April 3
| Minnesota
| 
| Luka Dončić (27)
| Luka Dončić (12)
| Luka Dončić (6)
| American Airlines Center19,576
| 31–47
|-bgcolor=ffcccc
| 79
| April 5
| Memphis
| 
| Courtney Lee (21)
| Dirk Nowitzki (7)
| Courtney Lee (7)
| American Airlines Center20,111
| 31–48
|-bgcolor=ccffcc
| 80
| April 7
| @ Memphis
| 
| Trey Burke (24)
| Dorian Finney-Smith (12)
| Jalen Brunson (10)
| FedExForum16,744
| 32–48
|-bgcolor=ccffcc
| 81
| April 9
| Phoenix
| 
| Dirk Nowitzki (30)
| Luka Dončić (11)
| Luka Dončić (11)
| American Airlines Center21,041
| 33–48
|-bgcolor=ffcccc
| 82
| April 10
| @ San Antonio
| 
| Dirk Nowitzki (20)
| Dwight Powell (16)
| Jalen Brunson (10)
| AT&T Center18.629
| 33–49

Player statistics

After all games.

|-
| 
| 2 || 0 || 5.5 || .000 || .000 || .500 || .5 || .0 || 1.0 || .0 || 1.0
|-
| 
| 38 || 0 || 19.8 || .418 || .297 || .705 || 2.5 || 5.6 || .6 || .0 || 10.9
|-
| †
| 49 || 49 || style=background:#0B60AD;color:white;|32.3 || .404 || .389 || .833 || 4.2 || 1.3 || .7 || .2 || 17.7
|-
| 
| 42 || 0 || 10.8 || .452 || .409 || .789 || 1.5 || .5 || .1 || .1 || 4.0
|-
| 
| 73 || 38 || 21.8 || .467 || .348 || .725 || 2.3 || 3.2 || .5 || .1 || 9.3
|-
| ≠
| 25 || 1 || 17.4 || .463 || .356 || style=background:#0B60AD;color:white;|.837 || 1.5 || 2.6 || .5 || .1 || 9.7
|-
| 
| 72 || style=background:#0B60AD;color:white;|72 || 32.2 || .427 || .327 || .713 || 7.8 || style=background:#0B60AD;color:white;|6.0 || 1.1 || .3 || style=background:#0B60AD;color:white;|21.2
|-
| 
| style=background:#0B60AD;color:white;|81 || 26 || 24.5 || .432 || .311 || .709 || 4.8 || 1.2 || .9 || .4 || 7.5
|-
| ≠
| 19 || 17 || 29.4 || .404 || .321 || .767 || 3.2 || 1.9 || .6 || .1 || 15.5
|-
| 
| 68 || 2 || 15.8 || .380 || .310 || .761 || 1.6 || 1.8 || .5 || .2 || 6.3
|-
| ≠
| 29 || 11 || 18.3 || .484 || .372 || .724 || 2.3 || 1.0 || .3 || .0 || 8.2
|-
| †
| 50 || 50 || 31.1 || style=background:#0B60AD;color:white;|.644 || .000 || .682 || style=background:#0B60AD;color:white;|13.7 || 2.0 || .7 || 1.1 || 11.0
|-
| 
| 71 || 18 || 21.2 || .453 || .353 || .784 || 4.6 || 1.0 || .5 || 1.1 || 6.8
|-
| ≠
| 22 || 4 || 12.2 || .390 || .282 || .714 || 1.2 || 1.0 || .6 || .0 || 3.6
|-
| 
| 8 || 0 || 11.3 || .370 || style=background:#0B60AD;color:white;|.455 || .571 || 1.5 || .9 || .1 || .0 || 3.6
|-
| †
| 44 || 44 || 29.8 || .414 || .380 || .791 || 2.3 || 2.3 || .8 || .3 || 13.1
|-
| 
| 36 || 4 || 11.1 || .491 || .324 || .625 || 3.6 || 1.0 || .3 || .7 || 3.9
|-
| 
| 51 || 20 || 15.6 || .359 || .312 || .780 || 3.1 || .7 || .2 || .4 || 7.3
|-
| 
| 77 || 22 || 21.6 || .597 || .307 || .772 || 5.3 || 1.5 || .6 || .6 || 10.6
|-
| †
| 32 || 32 || 28.4 || .440 || .344 || .695 || 3.0 || 4.3 || style=background:#0B60AD;color:white;|1.3 || .3 || 12.9
|-
| ‡
| 1 || 0 || 1.0 || .000 || .000 || .000 || .0 || .0 || .0 || .0 || .0
|}
‡Waived during the season
†Traded during the season
≠Acquired during the season

Awards

Transactions

Trades

Free agents

Re-signed

Additions

Subtractions

References

Dallas Mavericks seasons
Dallas Mavericks
Dallas Mavericks
Dallas Mavericks
2010s in Dallas
2018 in Texas
2019 in Texas